The Max Roach Trio Featuring the Legendary Hasaan is an album by American jazz drummer Max Roach, featuring pianist Hasaan Ibn Ali, recorded in 1964 and released on the Atlantic label in March 1965. The album represents the sole recording of Hasaan Ibn Ali that was ever released in his lifetime.

Reception

Allmusic awarded the album 4½ stars and its review by Scott Yanow states, "This is a classic of its kind and it is fortunate that it was made, but it is a tragedy that Hasaan would not record again and that he would soon sink back into obscurity".

Track listing
All compositions by Hasaan Ibn Ali
 "Three-Four vs. Six-Eight Four-Four Ways" - 5:40     
 "Off My Back Jack" - 5:13     
 "Hope So Elmo" - 3:52     
 "Almost Like Me" - 6:39     
 "Din-Ka Street" - 6:08     
 "Pay Not Play Not" - 8:08     
 "To Inscribe" - 5:00
Recorded in New York on December 4 (tracks 1, 4 & 5) and December 7 (tracks 2, 3, 6 & 7), 1964

Personnel 
Max Roach - drums
Hasaan Ibn Ali - piano
Art Davis  - bass

References 

1965 albums
Max Roach albums
Atlantic Records albums
Albums produced by Arif Mardin